Sarita Magar ( is a Nepali cricketer and an all-rounder of Nepali National Cricket team. She bats right handed and bowls right-arm medium-fast. She played in the 2014 Asian Games as a part of the Nepal women's national cricket team.  She has also played in Women's T20 Qualifier's Asian Region.

International career
Magar made her international debut in January-2019 against China in Thailand women's T20 smash tournament. 
She also represented Nepal in the 2019 ICC Women's Qualifier Asia in Bangkok, Thailand. This is a tournament which is an Asia region qualifier for the 2019 ICC Women's World Twenty20 Qualifier as well as the 2020 Women's Cricket World Cup Qualifier tournaments, with the top team progressing to both of them.

In October 2021, she was named in Nepal's side for the 2021 ICC Women's T20 World Cup Asia Qualifier tournament in the United Arab Emirates.

References

1992 births
Living people
Nepalese women cricketers
Cricketers at the 2010 Asian Games
Cricketers at the 2014 Asian Games
Asian Games competitors for Nepal
Nepal women Twenty20 International cricketers
South Asian Games bronze medalists for Nepal
South Asian Games medalists in cricket